Vexillum terebellum is an extinct species of sea snail, a marine gastropod mollusk, in the family Costellariidae, the ribbed miters.

Distribution
Fossils of this marine species were found in Eocene strata in Ile-de-France, France.

References

 Cossmann (M.), 1899 - Essais de Paléoconchologie comparée. livraison 3, p. 1-201 
 Cossmann (M.) & Pissarro (G.), 1911 - Iconographie complète des coquilles fossiles de l'Éocène des environs de Paris, t. 2, p. pl. 26-45
 Le Renard, J. & Pacaud, J. (1995). Révision des mollusques Paléogènes du Bassin de Paris. II. Liste des références primaires des espèces. Cossmanniana. 3: 65–132.
  Caze (B.), Merle (D.), Saint Martin (J.-P.) & Pacaud (J.-M.), 2011 - Contribution of résidual colour patterns to the species characterization of Caenozoic molluscs (Gastropoda, Bivalvia). Comptes Rendus Palevol, t. 10, vol. 2–3, p. 171-179
  Caze (B.), Merle (D.), Saint Martin (J.-P.) & Pacaud (J.-M.), 2012 - Les mollusques éocènes se dévoilent sous ultraviolets. Fossiles. Revue française de paléontologie, t. hors série n° 3, p. 15-56

External links
 Lamarck (J.B.P.A. de). (1803). Suite des mémoires sur les fossiles des environs de Paris. Annales du Muséum d'Histoire Naturelle. 2: 57-63; 163-169; 217-227

terebellum
Gastropods described in 1803